Anosimparihy is a rural municipality in Madagascar. It belongs to the district of Mananjary, which is a part of Vatovavy. The population of the commune was estimated to be approximately 10,000 in 2001 commune census.

Geography
It is situated at the Namorona River.

Only primary schooling is available. The majority (98%) of the population of the commune are farmers.  The most important crops are rice and bananas, while other important agricultural products are avocado, coffee and lychee. Services provide employment for 2% of the population.

References 

Populated places in Vatovavy